The women's team sprint competition of the cycling events at the 2011 Pan American Games was held on October 17 at the Pan American Velodrome in Guadalajara. This event was not held at the 2007 Pan American Games, and therefore was to make its debut at the games.

Schedule
All times are Central Standard Time (UTC−6).

Results
Seven pairs of two competitors each competed. The top two pairs race for gold, while third and fourth race for the bronze medals.

Qualification

Finals

References

Track cycling at the 2011 Pan American Games
Women's team sprint
Pan